Farafangana Airport is an airport in Farafangana, Madagascar .

Airlines and destinations

References

Airports in Madagascar
Fianarantsoa Province